Times Internet is an Indian internet technology company, based in Gurgaon, which owns, operates and invests in various internet-led products, services and technology. It is the digital arm of the Times Group, the largest media conglomerate in India. Times Internet currently owns and operates 39+ digital products across news, sports, music, video, trivia, spirituality and a suite of transaction-led market-places across real estate, personal finance, education, jobs, table reservation, etc.

Through its venture capital arm TVentures, Times Internet has invested in over 50 start-ups in the technology space such as logistics provider Delhivery, bus aggregating platform Shuttl, ed-tech platform Byju's, gaming platform MPL among others.

Times Internet reaches over 450 million monthly visitors who collectively spend over 13 billion minutes across all its products and services.

History

1999–2012: Initial years 

In its initial years, Times Internet primarily focused on digital media—handling the online versions of The Times Group which is owned by Sahu Jain family. Some major print publications includes The Times of India, The Economic Times and Navbharat Times.

Times Internet ventured into multiple new categories with mixed success. It entered social networking and e-commerce with Indiatimes but was unable to scale the business. The company achieved success with MagicBricks, an online real estate platform launched in 2006 and iDiva, a women's lifestyle portal in 2009.

2012–2017: Early investments 

Times Internet gradually transformed from a media-led company to a technology-led company. It became a conglomerate of multiple digital products, each operating independently within the group.

Times Internet made a series of acquisitions—buying majority stakes in MensXP in 2012, CricBuzz, Coupondunia and Dineout in 2014, Taskbucks in 2015, 'The Viral Shots' and WillowTV in 2016. In 2016, it also forged a strategic alliance with Haptik, an AI-enabled chatbot service. The company launched its startup accelerator, TLabs in 2012 through which it invested in upcoming digital startups like Delhivery, Pratilipi etc.

Times Internet also launched multiple new digital products—Happy Trips in 2014, ET Money and NewsPoint in 2015. Also in 2015, Times Internet launched Samayam, a website that provides news in Tamil, Telugu and Malayalam languages. In association with HDFC Bank, it launched 'Times Points HDFC Bank Debit Card', an exclusive co-branded debit card in 2016. It also ventured into video streaming with Box TV Limited in 2012 but shut it down in 2016.

As its portfolio kept growing, Times Internet built Colombia, a full stack AI led ad-tech network that united all its digital products on one central platform. Through this platform, it was able to move and monetize users across its various digital properties, based on consumer interests and needs.

2017–2019: Continued investments 
Times Internet continued to acquire and launch multiple new digital products across the consumer technology space. It launched ET Insure in February 2017, BrainBaazi in February 2018, and ET Prime in April 2018. It acquired 'House of God' in December 2017 and partnered with Tencent to invest $115 million in Gaana in February 2018.

On 28 June 2018, Times Internet acquired MX Player, the world's largest video player for $140 million.

On 20 February 2019, Times Internet re-launched MX Player as a video streaming platform, with over 100,000 hours of premium content across movies, TV and web shows etc.

On 15 April 2019, Times Internet revamped its brand identity to reflect its new "Everything. Everyday." ethos that desires to bring people closer to their interests and aspirations every day.

On 24 April 2019, Times Internet participated as a lead investor in $35.5 million (Rs 2.50 billion) Series-A funding round of Mobile Premier League (MPL).

Subsidiaries and products 
List of digital products owned and managed by Times Internet as of May 2019.
{| class="wikitable"
!Product 
! href="CricBuzz" |Description
!Note
|- href="HDFC Bank"
|Ahmedabad Mirror
|News portal focused on Ahmedabad
| rowspan="15" |News
|-
|Bangalore Mirror
|News portal focused on Bengaluru
|-
|Ei Samay
|News portal in Bengali
|-
|ET (The Economic Times)
|Business and financial news platform
|-
|ETimes
|Entertainment news portal
|-
|Indiatimes
|News and infotainment platform
|-
|Maharashtra Times
|News portal in Marathi
|-
|Miss Kyra
|Entertainment, lifestyle, and fashion news portal
|-
|Navbharat Times
|News portal in Hindi
|-
|NavGujarat Samay
|News portal in Gujarati
|-
|NewsPoint
|News aggregation portal
|-
|Pune Mirror
|News portal focused on Pune
|-
|TOI (Times of India)
|News portal in English
|-
|Vijay Karnataka
|News portal in Kannada
|-
|Samayam
|Infotainment and News portal in Malayalam, Telugu, and Tamil
|-
|Astrospeak
|Astrology and horoscope service
|
|TimesPropertyNews Portal for real estate industry
|
|-
|BaaziNow
|Live video and gaming platform
|
|-
|CouponDunia
|Deals discovery platform
|
|-Deals discovery platform
|-
|- href="Tencent" |CricBuzz
| href="IBM" |CricBuzz
|Cricket infotainment platform
|
|-
|CricPlay
|Cricket Fantasy App
|extinct
|-
|Databack
Data savings service
|DineoutTable reservation service
|-
|ET Money
|Personal money management service
|
|-
|Gaana
|Music streaming platform
|MX PlayerVideo player and streaming platformGet Me a ShopOffline to online eCommerce serviceHappy TripsTravel guide and information portaliDivaWomen's lifestyle portal
|-
|MagicBricks
|Real estate listings and information portal
|MensXPMen's lifestyle portalSpeaking TreeSpirituality platform and network
|-
|Taskbucks
|Reward based discovery platform
|
|-
|TechGig
|Technology platform and community
|
|-
|Times Card
|Lifestyle focused credit cards
|
|-
|Times Jobs
|Jobs listings portal
|
|-
|Times Now
|A TV news channel operates in India 
|
|-
|Times Prime
|Digital subscriptions platform
|
|-
|Whats Hot
|Local guide to your city
|
|-
|Willow
|A TV channel, broadcast cricket 
|
|-
|Gradeup
|Exam Preparation App
|
|}

References

External links 
  of Times Internet
 TechNews Updates

Web portals
Companies of The Times Group
Indian news websites
Online companies of India
Indian brands
Privately held companies of India
1999 establishments in Haryana
Indian companies established in 1999
Companies based in Gurgaon